Shenna Lee Bellows (born March 23, 1975) is an American politician and a non-profit executive director, best known for her work with the American Civil Liberties Union (ACLU). She is the 50th Maine secretary of state. On December 2, 2020 the Maine Legislature elected her to be Maine secretary of state. She is Executive Director of the Holocaust and Human Rights Center of Maine.

Bellows was the Democratic nominee for the United States Senate in Maine in the 2014 election. She was defeated by incumbent Republican senator Susan Collins.

Early life and education
Shenna Bellows was born on March 23, 1975, in Greenfield, Massachusetts, the eldest daughter of Dexter Bellows, a carpenter, and Janice Colson, a nurse.  She grew up in Hancock, Maine, where she attended Hancock Grammar School. Bellows grew up in a struggling family; they did not have running water or electricity, which the family could not afford, until she was in the fifth grade.

When Bellows was 15, she was an AFS-USA foreign exchange student in Campos, Brazil. Bellows graduated from Ellsworth High School in 1993.  During high school and college, Bellows worked as a research assistant at Mount Desert Island Biological Laboratory. She then attended Middlebury College, graduating magna cum laude in 1997 with highest honors for her thesis on economic and environmental sustainability.  During her junior year, she studied for a semester as an exchange student in San Jose, Costa Rica.

Early career
Bellows served as Executive Director of the ACLU of Maine for eight years.  In that role, she built coalitions with both Republicans and Democrats to pass privacy and civil rights laws.  She was a leader of Mainers United for Marriage, working for seven years to pass same-sex marriage in Maine. She was a leader on voting rights and co-chaired the 2011 Protect Maine Votes campaign to restore same day voter registration. Most recently, she organized a successful privacy campaign to require warrants for access to private cell phone communications, and she led the opposition to warrantless drone surveillance.

During her time at the ACLU, Bellows was a leader in the Maine Choice Coalition and the Coalition for Maine Women.  She was recognized for her work to advance women’s health and reproductive choice by awards from the University of Maine Women’s Studies Department, Mabel Wadsworth Women’s Health Center, the American Association of University Women, the Frances Perkins Center and the Maine Democratic Party.

Prior to her work at the ACLU of Maine, Bellows was the national field organizer at the ACLU in Washington, DC, organizing nationwide civil liberties campaigns including opposition to the Patriot Act, where she built broad coalitions that included librarians and gun owners alike.

Bellows was an AmeriCorps VISTA volunteer in Nashville, Tennessee.  There she assisted a start up non-profit, Community IMPACT! in developing an asset building program to promote educational and economic empowerment for young people in Nashville’s largest public housing project.

Bellows served as a small business development Peace Corps volunteer in La Arena de Chitré, Panama. In Panama, she launched a micro-lending program for artisans, started a Junior Achievement entrepreneurship program at a local high school, and was President of Women In Development/Gender and Development, dedicated to advancing economic and educational opportunity for women and girls.

From 1997 to 1999 Bellows worked as a researcher and recruiter for Economists Incorporated, a privately held economic consulting firm specializing in microeconomic analysis in antitrust, regulatory and legal contexts in Washington, DC.

Political career
She launched her candidacy for the United States Senate in 2014 on October 23, 2013. In November, she was defeated.

Bellows announced on March 4, 2016 that she would run for the Maine Senate in District 14, including her hometown of Manchester and ten other towns in the Augusta area. She ran as a publicly financed candidate. She won election to the Maine Senate on November 8, 2016, and took office on December 7, 2016. Bellows won reelection to the Maine Senate in 2018 defeating Republican Matt Stone with 57.9% of the vote. She was reelected again in 2020, winning 56% of the vote over Republican Mark Walker. She resigned from the Senate on December 2, 2020. A special election was scheduled for March 2021.

In December 2020, Bellows was elected the secretary of state of Maine. She is the first female to hold the position. In Maine, the secretary of state is elected biannually in December by a joint session of the Maine Legislature for a term that began in January.

Political positions

Abortion
Bellows is pro-choice, describing herself as “a strong advocate for women's healthcare and reproductive freedom including access to abortion and contraception”.

Agriculture
Bellows wants to greatly decrease subsidies for large agricultural corporations.

Campaign finance
Bellows opposes the Citizens United v. FEC decision, and supports public financing of elections and strong disclosure requirements.

Capital punishment
Bellows opposes the death penalty.

Defense
Bellows supports large cuts to the defense budget, and largely opposes military intervention by the U.S., saying “we cannot afford to be the world's military policeman”.

Environment
Bellows supports federal regulation of greenhouse gas emissions to combat climate change.

Guns
Bellows supports universal background checks, and says she would have voted for the Manchin-Toomey Amendment.

Healthcare
Bellows opposes efforts to repeal the Affordable Care Act, and supports expanding coverage through the Medicaid and Medicare programs.

LGBTQ rights
Bellows led the effort to enact marriage equality in Maine as the head of Mainers United for Marriage. She supports federal anti-discrimination protections against LGBT people.

Minimum wage
In 2014, Bellows supported increasing the federal minimum wage to $10.10, and indexing it to inflation. In 2016, she supported a ballot initiative to gradually raise Maine’s minimum wage to $12 by 2020.

Social Security
Bellows advocates for eliminating the cap on income taxable under the social security payroll tax in order to increase benefits.

Taxes
Bellows supports decreasing the tax burden on lower- and middle-income families, as well as small businesses, but wants to “make sure the wealthiest Americans pay their fair share” and does not support lowering taxes for high-earners or corporations.
Bellows supports large increases in corporate and capital gains taxes, as well as the personal income tax rates for higher-earning brackets.

Personal life
Bellows lives with her husband, Brandon Baldwin, in Manchester, Maine.

Electoral history

Maine Senate District 14

United States Senate

References

External links
Official campaign site
 

|-

1975 births
2020 United States presidential electors
21st-century American politicians
21st-century American women politicians
American Civil Liberties Union people
Candidates in the 2014 United States elections
Living people
Democratic Party Maine state senators
Middlebury College alumni
People from Greenfield, Massachusetts
People from Hancock, Maine
People from Manchester, Maine
Secretaries of State of Maine
Women state legislators in Maine